MSPB may refer to:

MSP Batna, an Algerian Football club
United States Merit Systems Protection Board, a United States agency